Ronald M. Squires (November 9, 1951 – January 8, 1993), commonly known as Ron Squires, was an American politician from Vermont. A Democrat, he served two years in the Vermont House of Representatives, representing Guilford, Vernon and part of Brattleboro from 1991 until his death.

Biography 
An eighth-generation Vermonter, Squires was elected in 1990 as Vermont's first openly gay legislator. In the general election held on November 6, 1990, he defeated Republican incumbent Sam Hunt by 38 votes. He was re-elected unopposed in 1992 but died just days after being sworn-in for his second term in January 1993. Squires died from viral meningitis, an AIDS-related illness. He had served five years on the Democratic National Committee.

References 

1952 births
1993 deaths
20th-century American politicians
AIDS-related deaths in Vermont
Gay politicians
LGBT state legislators in Vermont
Democratic Party members of the Vermont House of Representatives
People from Windsor County, Vermont
20th-century American LGBT people